The Myrskylä church village (also known as Myrskylä;) is a village and the administrative center in the municipality by the same name in Eastern Uusimaa. It is located on the western shore of a lake called Kirkkojärvi. The center of the nearest town, Orimattila, is less than 20 kilometers to the north.

The village is home to the Myrskylä Church, which was inaugurated in 1803. Many other of the municipality's main services are also located in the church village, including the Sale grocery store, health center, pharmacy, library and the Osuuspankki bank. The village also has an elementary school founded in 1872.

See also 
 Lapinjärvi (village)

Sources 
Suuri Maatilakirja III (Uusimaa), kohta Myrskylä (in Finnish)
Suomen maatalousmuseo Sarka Sarka - maatilat webissä (in Finnish)

References

External links 
Map of the Myrskylä village

Myrskylä
Villages in Finland